Fatherhood was the third of five albums of home-made recordings, released by Stephen Jones under the name Baby Bird in 1995. The album includes a version of the song "Goodnight", which was subsequently released as the first single by Jones' band Babybird (written as one word).

It was originally a limited edition release, but is now available as part of the 2002 CD box set The Original Lo-Fi.

Critical reception

"...a mixture of whimsy, egotism and madness with a good bit of talent stirred in...his puzzled world-view is unique. He fills the 20 tracks with strangenesses. Weirdly wonderful." – The Guardian

"Fatherhood is another unpredictable and magical journey through the thoughts of Stephen Jones, a man who is clearly in love with sweet melodies and the millions of ways you can fuck them up...you might find the whole experience as cigar-puffingly satisfying as becoming a dad." – The Independent

Track listing
All tracks written and composed by Stephen Jones.

"No Children" – 1:08
"Cooling Towers" – 3:14
"Cool & Crazy Things to Do" – 2:41
"Bad Blood" – 3:55
"Neil Armstrong" – 2:21
"I Was Never Here" – 3:53
"Saturday" – 2:29
"Good Night" – 3:26
"I Don't Want to Wake You Up" – 3:27
"Iceberg" – 3:10
"Aluminium Beach" – 4:36
"Goddamn It, You're a Kid" – 3:07
"Daisies" – 2:08
"Failed Old Singer" – 3:34
"Fatherhood" – 2:28
"Dustbin Liner" – 2:53
"Not About a Girl" – 2:32
"Good Weather" – 3:25
"But Love" – 1:58
"May We" – 3:35

References

1995 albums
Babybird albums